Guyencourt-sur-Noye is a commune in the Somme department in Hauts-de-France in northern France.

Geography

History
In 1692, the village name was written as Guiencourt. Prehistoric flint tools have been found in the vicinity

Population

See also
Communes of the Somme department

References

Communes of Somme (department)